Aurel Vernescu (23 January 1939 – 1 December 2008) was a Romanian sprint canoeist. He competed at the 1960, 1964, 1968 and 1972 Olympics and won three medals with a silver in 1972 in the K-4 1000 m and two bronze medals in 1964 in the K-1 1000 m and K-4 1000 m events. He served as a flag bearer for Romania at the 1964, 1968 and 1972 Olympics.

Vernescu also won eleven medals at the ICF Canoe Sprint World Championships with four golds (K-1 500 m: 1963, 1966; K-1 4×500 m: 1963, K-2 500 m: 1966), five silvers (K-1 1000 m: 1963, K-1 4×500 m: 1970, 1971, K-2 500 m: 1966, 1970; K-2 1000 m: 1966), and one bronze (K-1 4×500 m: 1966).

Vernescu took up kayaking aged 13 and in total won 42 national titles. He retired from competitions in 1972 to become a kayaking coach and administrator.

References

Prosport.ro 2 December 2008 article on Vernescu's death.  – accessed 18 March 2009.

External links

 
 
 

1939 births
2008 deaths
Canoeists at the 1960 Summer Olympics
Canoeists at the 1964 Summer Olympics
Canoeists at the 1968 Summer Olympics
Canoeists at the 1972 Summer Olympics
Romanian male canoeists
Olympic canoeists of Romania
Olympic bronze medalists for Romania
Olympic silver medalists for Romania
Olympic medalists in canoeing
ICF Canoe Sprint World Championships medalists in kayak
Medalists at the 1972 Summer Olympics
Medalists at the 1964 Summer Olympics